Lucie Hrstková-Pešánová ( Hrstková; born 16 July 1981) is a Czech alpine ski racer. At the Universiade in Innsbruck in 2005 she won a gold medal in the Super-G. She took part in three Olympic Games.

Her husband is Filip Pešán, Czech ice hockey coach.

References

External links
 
 
 
 

1981 births
Czech female alpine skiers
Alpine skiers at the 1998 Winter Olympics
Alpine skiers at the 2002 Winter Olympics
Alpine skiers at the 2006 Winter Olympics
Olympic alpine skiers of the Czech Republic
People from Valašské Meziříčí
Living people
Universiade gold medalists for the Czech Republic
Universiade medalists in alpine skiing
Sportspeople from the Zlín Region